Le Meur, or Meur, is a Breton surname (ar Meur in Breton, meaning "the Great"), and may refer to:

Annaïg Le Meur, (born 1973), French politician
Daniel Le Meur, (born 1939), French politician
Géraldine Le Meur (born 1972), French innovator and business executive
Loïc Le Meur (born 1972), French entrepreneur and blogger.

Breton-language surnames